Mouhamad Anez (born 14 May 1995) is a Syrian footballer who plays as a midfielder for Bahraini club Al-Khaldiya and the Syria national team.

Club career 
Having played for Al-Jaish, Anez joined Al-Ittihad Aleppo on 1 September 2019. Following the 2020–21 Syrian Premier League, he left Al-Ittihad after his contract's expiration.

Anez moved to Al-Karamah in summer 2021, but was promptly allowed to join Bahraini Premier League club Riffa, as "it was agreed that the player would leave, in the event that he received an offer from abroad before the start of the league".

International career 
Having represented Syria internationally at under-23 level, Anez made his senior debut on 8 July 2019, in a friendly against North Korea. He scored his first international goal on 3 December 2021, helping Syria beat Tunisia 2–0 in the 2021 FIFA Arab Cup.

Career statistics

International 

Scores and results list Syria's goal totally first, score column indicates score after each Anez goal.

References

External links
 
 
 
 

1995 births
Living people
People from Al-Hasakah
Syrian footballers
Association football midfielders
Al-Jazeera SC (Syria) players
Al-Jaish Damascus players
Al-Ittihad Aleppo players
Al-Khaldiya SC players
Syrian Premier League players
Bahraini Premier League players
Syria youth international footballers
Syria international footballers
Syrian expatriate footballers
Syrian expatriate sportspeople in Bahrain
Expatriate footballers in Bahrain